The Greater Boston League (GBL) is a high school athletic conference in District B of the Massachusetts Interscholastic Athletic Association. The league originally included teams from the cities and towns of Medford, Malden, Somerville, Everett, Cambridge, Arlington, Peabody, Waltham, and Revere. Teams continued to leave for different leagues until only those of Everett, Malden, Medford, and Somerville were left in 2017. The league disbanded that year and the remaining members joined the Northeastern Conference.  The GBL reformed in 2019. The four members that remained in the GBL in 2017 (Everett, Malden, Medford, and Somerville) rejoined the league with the addition of Revere.

Schools
The following schools are current members of the Greater Boston League.

References

Massachusetts Interscholastic Athletic Association leagues